Rafael Santos de Sousa (born 2 February 1998), known as Rafael Santos, is a Brazilian professional footballer who currently plays as a centre-back for Liga Portugal 2 club Moreirense.

Career

Flamengo
On 5 May 2019 Santos debuted for Flamengo in a Campeonato Brasileiro Série A match at Estádio do Morumbi against São Paulo, he came to the match as a substitute as head coach Abel Braga fielded the whole team with reserves, the match ended 1–1.

APOEL (loan)
On 29 May 2020 APOEL signed Santos from Flamengo on loan until May 2022. On 21 August 2020 he debuted in a Cypriot First Division 2-2 match against Karmiotissa FC, Santos scored APOEL's second goal.

Career statistics

Club

Notes

Honours
Flamengo
Campeonato Brasileiro Série A: 2019
Campeonato Carioca: 2019

References

1998 births
Living people
Brazilian footballers
Association football defenders
CR Flamengo footballers
Moreirense F.C. players
APOEL FC players
Campeonato Brasileiro Série A players
Cypriot First Division players
Liga Portugal 2 players
Expatriate footballers in Cyprus
Brazilian expatriate sportspeople in Portugal
Expatriate footballers in Portugal
Brazilian expatriate footballers